John Morley (by 1530 – will proven 1565) was an English politician.

He was a Member (MP) of the Parliament of England for Lewes in November 1554.

References

1565 deaths
English MPs 1554–1555
Year of birth uncertain